In the  PRINCE2 project management method, a product description (PDD) is a structured format that presents information about a project product. It is a management product (document), usually created by the project manager during the process of initiating a project in the initial stage of the PRINCE2 project management method. It is approved by the project board as part of the project plan documentation.

It should not be confused with a project product description(PPD), which (in the PRINCE2 method) is generated in the start up process of the pre-project stage, and forms part of the Project Brief. 
While the PPD is related to "finalist products"—those delivered to the client at the end of the project—the PDD refers to  all project products, including intermediate products necessary in the project life that need definition.
For example, in a project to build a plane wing, the finalist product is the actual wing, and has acceptance criteria defined in the corresponding PPD. However, the project may require simulations, and even a wind-tunnel prototype and testing rig.  Those are intermediate products, not handed or delivered to the client. However they are still subject to definitions and quality criteria that is detailed in the corresponding PDDs. Therefore, all product contained in the PPD are also in the PDDs, but not the other way.

The structure of product description, according to PRINCE2:
 Identifier
 Title
 Purpose
 Composition
 Derivation
 Format and presentation
 Development Skill Required
 Quality criteria
 Quality tolerances
 Quality method
 Quality skills required
 Quality Responsibilities

See also
 List of project management topics
 Project plan

References

PRINCE2